This is a list of Illinois State Redbirds football players in the NFL Draft.

Key

Selections

Notable undrafted players
Note: No drafts held before 1920

References

Illinois State

Illinois State Redbirds NFL Draft